Moghanjuq (also Romanized as Moghānjūq; also known as Moghānjīq and Muwanjik) is a village in Zulachay Rural District, in the Central District of Salmas County, West Azerbaijan Province, Iran. At the 2006 census, its population was 2,963, in 798 families.

References 

Populated places in Salmas County